Silvia Soler may refer to:
Sílvia Soler i Guasch (born 1961), Catalan writer and journalist
Sílvia Soler Espinosa (born 1987), Spanish tennis player

Human name disambiguation pages